Ekakini is a 1978 Indian Malayalam film, directed and produced by G. S. Panicker. The film stars Shobha, Indra Balan and Ravi Menon in the lead roles. The film is an adaptation of the short story "Karutha Chandran" by M. T. Vasudevan Nair. It was the debut of G. S. Panicker. Noted painter C. N. Karunakaran also made his debut as art director with this film. Ekakini is considered the first road movie in Malayalam.

Cast
Shobha 
Indra Balan
Ravi Menon

References

External links
 

1978 films
1970s Malayalam-language films